Deltinea is a genus of moths belonging to the subfamily Tortricinae of the family Tortricidae.

Species
Deltinea costalimai Pastrana, 1961

See also
List of Tortricidae genera

References

 , 1961, Revta. Invest. Agric. 15: 343.
 , 2005, World Catalogue of Insects 5

External links
tortricidae.com

Euliini
Tortricidae genera